Noël Dejonckheere (23 April 1955 – 29 December 2022) was a Belgian professional road cyclist.

Dejonckheere died on 29 December 2022, at the age of 67.

Major results

1976
 1st Quad Cities
1978
 1st  Points race, UCI Amateur Track World Championships
 Coors Classic
 1st Stages 5 & 8 
1979
 1st Overall Costa del Azahar
1st Stages 1 & 3
 1st Stage 2b Tour Méditerranéen
 1st Stage 5a Deutschland Tour
 1st Stage 2 GP Leganes
 Vuelta a España
 1st Stages 10 & 11 
 Volta a la Comunitat Valenciana
 1st Stages 1, 2, 4, 5 & 6 
 Vuelta a Cantabria
 1st Stages 1 & 2a 
1980
 1st Stage 3 Paris–Nice
 1st Stage 4 Tour Méditerranéen
 1st Stage 5 Vuelta a Aragón
 1st Stage 3 Vuelta a Mallorca
 Volta a la Comunitat Valenciana
 1st Stages 2 & 5
 Vuelta a Andalucía
 1st Stages 2 & 4  
1981
 1st Trofeo Luis Puig
 1st Stage 1 Vuelta a La Rioja
 Volta a la Comunitat Valenciana
 1st Stages 2 & 5 
 Vuelta a Castilla y León
 1st Stages 1 & 2 
 3rd Omloop van de Westhoek
1982
 1st Stage 7b Deutschland Tour
 1st Stage 3a Ruota d'Oro
 2nd Milano–Torino
 6th Milano–Vignola
 6th Giro del Friuli
 6th Coppa Sabatini
 8th Coppa Bernocchi
1983
 1st Overall Costa del Azahar
1st Stage 1
 1st Trofeo Luis Puig
 1st Stage 12 Vuelta a España
 1st Stage 3b Volta a Catalunya
 1st Stage 2b Vuelta a Cantabria
 Vuelta a Andalucía
 1st Stages 1 & 3 
 Vuelta a Castilla y León
 1st Stages 2 & 3 
 8th Milan–San Remo
1984
 1st Ronde van Limburg
 1st Trofeo Luis Puig
 1st Stage 3 Paris–Nice
 1st Stage 2a Vuelta a la Comunidad Valenciana
 Vuelta a España
 1st Stages 1, 4 & 19 
 5th Road race, National Road Championships
 8th Milan–San Remo
 10th Overall Vuelta a Andalucía
1st Stage 5a
1985
 1st Trofeo Masferrer
 1st Stage 2 Vuelta a Castilla y León
 1st Stage 2 Tour of Galicia
 Vuelta a Burgos
 1st Stages 1 & 2 
 Vuelta a Cantabria
 1st Stages 1 & 4 
 Vuelta a Aragón
 1st Stages 2 & 3 
1986
 3rd Trofeo Masferrer
1987 
 1st Stage 2 Vuelta a Andalucía
 Vuelta a Murcia
 1st Stages 1b & 4 
1988
 1st Stage 1 Vuelta a Andalucía

Grand Tour general classification results timeline

References

External link

1955 births
2022 deaths
Belgian male cyclists
People from Lendelede
Cyclists from West Flanders
Belgian Vuelta a España stage winners
20th-century Belgian people